Philip Milanov (born 6 July 1991) is a Belgian discus thrower. He is a five-time Belgian champion and the 2015 World University Games champion in men's discus throw.

Biography
Milanov was born in Bruges, Belgium on 6 July 1991. His father and coach, Emil Milanov, was himself a discus thrower in his native Bulgaria before moving to Belgium in 1989. Philip Milanov won the Belgian junior championship in 2010 with a throw of 54.28 m (1.75 kg), ranking him fourth on the Belgian all-time junior list. In 2011 he represented Belgium at the European Team Championships First League, placing ninth with 54.88 m; at that summer's Belgian championships he was second to Maarten Persoon of the Netherlands but the top Belgian, winning his first national senior title. He repeated as Belgian champion in 2012.

Milanov broke 60 metres for the first time in 2013, setting a Belgian under-23 record of 61.81 m in Vilvoorde and placing fifth at the European U23 Championships in Tampere. He continued to improve in 2014, breaking Jo Van Daele's old Belgian record (64.24 m) by eight centimetres in Lille on 23 February and improving the record further to 66.02 m at the FBK Games in Hengelo on 8 June; he was Belgian champion for the fourth consecutive year (60.57 m) and made his debut in the IAAF Diamond League. Milanov was eliminated in the qualification round at the 2014 European Championships in Zürich; Track & Field News ranked him ninth in the world that year, his first top 10 ranking.

Milanov broke his own Belgian record again in Kessel-Lo on 25 April 2015, throwing 66.43 m and meeting the qualification standard for the 2015 World Championships in Beijing. In July 2015 he won gold with 64.15 m at the World University Games in Gwangju, South Korea. He unexpectedly scored his first Diamond League victory two weeks later at the London Grand Prix; in rainy conditions, he threw 65.14 m to defeat a field that included Diamond Race leader Piotr Małachowski of Poland. In August 2015 he broke again his Belgian record and met the qualification standard for the 2016 Olympic Games. On 29 August 2015 at the World Championships in Beijing, where he took silver, Milanov, improved his national record to 66.90 m.

References

External links

1991 births
Living people
Belgian male discus throwers
Sportspeople from Bruges
Belgian people of Bulgarian descent
World Athletics Championships athletes for Belgium
World Athletics Championships medalists
European Athletics Championships medalists
Athletes (track and field) at the 2016 Summer Olympics
Olympic athletes of Belgium
Universiade medalists in athletics (track and field)
Universiade gold medalists for Belgium
Belgian Athletics Championships winners
Medalists at the 2015 Summer Universiade